Izumi Iimura (born 2 December 1980) is a former Japanese cricketer who played three Women's One Day International cricket matches for Japan national women's cricket team in 2003.

References

1980 births
Living people
Japanese women cricketers
Wicket-keepers